Fathabad (also Romanized as Fatḩābād) is a village in Eresk Rural District of Eresk District, Boshruyeh County, South Khorasan province, Iran. At the 2006 National Census, its population was 378 in 104 households, when it was in the former Boshruyeh District of Ferdows County. The following census in 2011 counted 344 people in 104 households, by which time the district had been separated from the county and Boshruyeh County established. The latest census in 2016 showed a population of 317 people in 105 households; it was the largest village in its rural district.

References 

Boshruyeh County

Populated places in South Khorasan Province

Populated places in Boshruyeh County